The Roman Catholic Diocese of Fresno is a particular church of the Latin Church of the Roman Catholic Church in the western region (XI) of the United States, in the State of California. It is a suffragan diocese of the Archdiocese of Los Angeles. The diocese consists of all of the Counties of Fresno, Inyo, Kern, Kings, Madera, Mariposa, Merced, and Tulare. The total population of the diocesan region is about 2.4 million inhabitants, of whom 1,074,944 are registered Catholic as of 2012. For administrative purposes the diocese is sub-divided into five deaneries: Fresno City, Fresno (rural), Tulare/Kings, Kern/Inyo, and Merced/Mariposa.

History
The see was created in 1967 by splitting the Diocese of Monterey-Fresno into two sees.  Historically the area of the current diocese belonged to the Dioceses of Guadalajara, Durango, Sonora, Californias, Monterey, Monterey-Los Angeles, and lastly Monterey-Fresno. Timothy Manning (first Bishop of Fresno) and Roger Mahony (Auxiliary Bishop) have both served in the diocese.

The most recent ordinary, John Thomas Steinbock, was appointed the fourth Bishop of Fresno on October 15, 1991, taking over from Apostolic Administrator Most Rev. Norman McFarland, Bishop of the Roman Catholic Diocese of Orange. He served in that position until his death from lung cancer on December 5, 2010. Since 1922 the diocesan see has been in the City of Fresno with the cathedra remaining at St. John's Cathedral (which also served as the seat of the former Diocese of Monterey-Fresno).  The diocese maintains 86 parishes, several charities, two high schools, numerous elementary schools, a small newspaper, retreat center and several cemeteries.

In 2003, the Diocese of Fresno was one of only four Latin Church dioceses in the United States that did not participate in the United States Conference of Catholic Bishops review of the Charter for the Protection of Children and Young People.

Bishops

Bishops of Fresno
Timothy Manning (1967-1969), appointed Coadjutor Archbishop and later Archbishop of Los Angeles (elevated to Cardinal in 1973)
Hugh Aloysius Donohoe (1969-1980) 
José de Jesús Madera Uribe (1980-1991, coadjutor bishop 1979-1980), appointed Auxiliary Bishop for the Military Services, USA
John Thomas Steinbock (1991-2010)
Armando Xavier Ochoa (2011-2019)
Joseph Vincent Brennan (2019–present)

Auxiliary Bishops
Roger Mahony (1975-1980), appointed Bishop of Stockton and later Archbishop of Los Angeles (created a Cardinal in 1991)

Other priest of this diocese who became a bishop
 Myron Joseph Cotta, appointed auxiliary bishop of Sacramento in 2014, appointed Bishop of Stockton in 2018

Churches

Schools

Parishes

See also
 Catholic Church by country
 Catholic Church hierarchy
 List of the Catholic dioceses of the United States

Notes

External links
Roman Catholic Diocese of Fresno Official Site 

 
Culture of Fresno, California
Fresno
Christian organizations established in 1967
Fresno
Fresno